Edgardo Vaghi (30 June 1915 – 9 December 1986) was an Italian bobsledder who competed in the late 1930s. He later fought for Italy in the Aeronautica Nazionale Repubblicana during World War II over Greece and the Soviet Union. Prior to both careers, he competed in auto racing.

Auto racing career
In 1935, Vaghi was Class II champion in the touring car event from Milan to San Remo.

Bobsleigh career
Vaghi finished 11th in the two-man event at the 1936 Winter Olympics in Garmisch-Partenkirchen.

Military career
As a Second Lieutenant (Sottotenete in Italian), Vaghi fought against the Royal Air Force in Greece in 1941 which damaged his fighter plane.

References

External links
 
1936 bobsleigh two-man results
Milan to San Remo 1935 results featuring Vaghi
ANR article on Torresi including Vaghi
RAF fighting in Greece in 1941 featuring Vaghi
Edgardo Vaghi's profile at Sports Reference.com

1915 births
1986 deaths
Olympic bobsledders of Italy
Bobsledders at the 1936 Winter Olympics
Italian aviators
Italian male bobsledders
Italian racing drivers
Regia Aeronautica personnel of World War II